Łączkowice  is a village in the administrative district of Gmina Masłowice, within Radomsko County, Łódź Voivodeship, in central Poland. In 1797, a settlement of Germans was formed in the village

References

Villages in Radomsko County